Lopamudra Raut is an engineer, actor, an Indian beauty queen, a former Miss India who represented India at Miss United continents and won this international pageant in Ecuador (South America) amongst 45 other countries. Lopamudra Raut also made it to the top in India’s most desirable women’s list.

Early life and education
Raut was born on 7 October 1994 to Jeevan Raut and Ragini Raut in Nagpur. She has a sister Bhagyashree Raut. She is an Electrical Engineer. She did B.E in Electrical engineering from G. H. Raisoni College of Engineering Nagpur .

Career

Modeling and pageantry
Raut participated in Femina Miss India Goa in 2013 where she finished as 1st Runner Up. It gave her a direct entry to participate in Femina Miss India 2013, where she was a finalist. She then participated in Femina Miss India 2014 where she won the subtitle of 'Miss Body Beautiful' and made it to the Top 5. In the same year, she took part in the Miss Diva 2014 pageant and made it to top 7 as a finalist. In 2016, she was selected by Femina organizers to compete in the Miss United Continents pageant. Raut was crowned as second runner up at Miss United Continents 2016 which took place on 25 September 2016, in Guayaquil, Ecuador.

Bigg Boss and film debut
In 2016, Raut participated in Colors TV's Bigg Boss 10 as a celebrity contestant and emerged as the second runner up.  In 2017, Raut participated in Fear Factor: Khatron Ke Khiladi 8 and finished as a semi finalist.

Raut will make her film debut with Blood Story, a psychological thriller.

In the media
Raut was ranked 5th in Times Of Indias Maharashtra's Most Desirable Women List.

She was also listed in Times of Indias 50 Most Desirable Women 2017.

Filmography

Television

Web series

Awards

See also
 Femina Miss India
 Sushrii Shreya Mishraa
 Gail Nicole Da Silva
 Purva Rana

References

External links

Lopamudra Raut at IMDb
 

Femina Miss India
1991 births
Female models from Maharashtra
Living people
Beauty pageant contestants from India
Indian beauty pageant winners
Fear Factor: Khatron Ke Khiladi participants
Bigg Boss (Hindi TV series) contestants